The 2020–21 Aberdeen F.C. season was Aberdeen's 107th season in the top flight of Scottish football and the eighth in the Scottish Premiership. Aberdeen also competed in the Scottish Cup, the League Cup and in qualifying for the Europa League.

Summary

May
The kits were released for the season on 21 May.

June
On 10 June, after nine years at the club goalkeeper Danny Rogers officially left the club after making the announcement via his Twitter account. On 12 June, the club announced the departures of Frank Ross, development squad players Sam Jackson, Luc Bollan, Lloyd Robertson, Sebastian Ross, Jack Chesser, Sean Linden and Chris Antoniazzi, David Dangana and youth players Kieran Shanks and Kyle Dalling. On 15 June, the first team returned to training under strict guidelines due to the pandemic. On 17 June, Aberdeen's qualification for the Europa League qualifying rounds was confirmed by UEFA with one-off matches to be played. On 18 June, the club announced talks of temporary wage cuts to players and staff. On 23 June, after his contract expired after three years at Celtic, Irish winger Jonny Hayes rejoined the Dons on a two-year deal. He also took a significant wage cut.

July
It was announced a first team player had tested positive for COVID-19 but it was undisclosed who the player was and that he was asymptomatic. On 2 July, Czech goalkeeper Tomáš Černý signed a new one-year deal. On 6 July, the Premiership fixtures were published, with the Dons kicking off at home to Rangers live on Sky Sports with the game to be played behind closed doors according to Scottish government guidelines. Sam Cosgrove turned down a £2m move to French Second Division side Guingamp. On 11 July, Aberdeen played a friendly match against fellow Scottish Premiership side Ross County at Cormack Park with a 2–2 draw and Bruce Anderson scored both goals. The kick-off time for the opening Rangers match was brought forward five hours by Sky Sports. The Dons then lost a friendly at Pittodrie to St Johnstone with Anderson again scoring. Pre-season ended with a 1–1 draw against Hibernian at Pittodrie with Craig Bryson on target. Sam Cosgrove was announced to be out injured for "eight to ten weeks". The squad numbers for the season was also revealed by the club. On 31 July, Ryan Edmondson joined from Leeds United on loan and Tommie Hoban signed a contract until January.

August
The Dons began their Premiership campaign with a 1–0 loss at home to Rangers which also saw Andrew Considine sent off late on. A few days later, it was revealed that eight first-team players were self-isolating after two of them had tested positive for COVID-19 after they had been on a night out after the Rangers match. The game was later postponed until 20 August and the Livingston match put back twenty-four hours, with manager Derek McInnes and also Scottish Government leader Nicola Sturgeon very critical of the players because of their actions. Furthermore, the following matches against both Hamilton Academical and Celtic were also postponed. On 12 August, the club announced loan player Ryan Edmondson had been ruled out for three to four months with an ankle injury and returned to parent club Leeds United to see a specialist. All eight players involved in breaking lockdown rules were 'heavily fined' by the club and were later given a three-match suspended ban. On 18 August, Ross McCrorie signed from bitter Premiership rivals Rangers initially on a one-year loan due to financial issues at the club with an obligation to buy for a reported fee of around £350,000 on a three-year deal, after rejecting the chance to sign for Hibs. Aberdeen got their first win of the season by beating St Johnstone in their second League match after waiting nineteen days with a Ryan Hedges deflected goal. After his release, youngster Frank Ross signed Dutch Ereste Divisie side Go Ahead Eagles. Aberdeen also learned they would face Faroese side NSÍ Runavík in the first round of Qualifying for the Europa League. Welsh striker Marley Watkins signed on loan from Bristol City until January. The Dons had another win, this time at home to Livingston with Scott Wright and Ryan Hedges linking up well for the second goal. Aberdeen beat Faroese part timers NSÍ Runavík scoring six goals and with Hedges this time scoring a hat-trick after coming on as a sub, they progressed through to the next round of qualifying where they were drawn to face Viking of Norway. They ended the month at Easter Road against Hibs by dominating the match but only winning with a penalty from Lewis Ferguson.

September
Scott McKenna played in both Scotland matches against Israel and Czech Republic. Meanwhile, both Miko Virtanen and Michael Ruth joined Arbroath on loan until the end of the season. Also chairman Dave Cormack hoped that fans would be allowed back into the stadium as test events with 300 at Kilmarnock and 750 at Motherwell home matches. 300 fans were allowed in to watch the Dons beat Kilmarnock with Ross McCrorie's first goal for the club separating the sides. On 9 September, midfielder Craig Bryson left the club via mutual consent. He went on to join St Johnstone. They continued in Europe with a fine 2–0 Viking in Norway, with Hedgy scoring directly from a corner. However, the Dons returned home and individual errors cost them in the first half leading to a 3–0 defeat to Motherwell, where also no fans were present due to an increase in Covid numbers. Three youngsters Connor Power, Luke Turner and Tyler Mykyta joined Highland Football League side Turriff United on loan for the season. On 23 September, Scott McKenna joined English Championship side Nottingham Forest for a fee rumored to be around £3,000,000 with add-ons rising to £2,000,000, a club-record fee. The Dons then travelled to Portugal to play Sporting CP, where ten positive Covid cases were recorded within the Sporting CP squad including their manager and all were isolating. The assistant manager would take over for the match The Dons went on to lose the match, losing at this stage for the sixth time in seven seasons. They got back to Premiership action with a 3–0 win against ten-man Ross County with Marley Watkins scoring his first goal for the club.

October
Aberdeen continued in the league with a 2–1 home win against the Buddies, with the Dons coming from behind to win with a last-minute goal. Ethan Ross signed for Raith Rovers on a season loan. The following day, youngster Jack Mackenzie joined Forfar on loan for the season. Greg Leigh rejoined the club on deadline day, this time permananety from NAC Breda after his release. Gary Woods joined the club on loan from English League Two side Oldham Athletic initially for three months after an injury to back-up goalie Tomas Cerny. Having made thirty-seven appearances for the club, striker Bruce Anderson left on loan to join Ayr for the season. Lewis Ferguson, Connor McLennan & Ross McCrorie, Niall McGinn, Ronny Hernandez, Connor Barron and Ryan Duncan were all called up for their countries for the latest round of International matches. McCrorie scored for the Under 21s and McGinn scored for Northern Ireland in Bosnia. After the Scotland match, it was announced that both McCrorie and Andrew Considine were called up to play Slovakia. Considine went on to make his debut, and at the age of 33 he became the oldest to do so since 1967. McLennan also scored for the Under 21s in San Marino. Defender Tommie Hoban extended his deal until the end of the season. Aberdeen returned to league action at Dundee United and dominated but could not find the net in a scoreless draw. However they got back to winning ways putting four past Hamilton Academical in their rearranged match, moving up to third in the table. On 23 October, former manager Ebbe Skovdahl died aged 75. There was a minute silence before the match against Celtic which ended in a thrilling 3–3 draw.

November
The Dons beat their nearest league rivals Hibernian 2–0 to jump them to third in the table. Aberdeen were drawn to play St Mirren in the League Cup. For the November Internationals, Andrew Considine, Connor McLennan, Ross McCrorie and Lewis Ferguson, Niall McGinn (injured his calf), Matty Kennedy and Greg Leigh were all called up for their countries for the latest round of International matches. However whilst on duty, McCrorie tested positive for COVID-19 so he along with McLennan and Ferguson had to self-isolate. Scott Wright picked up a groin injury and he also missed the match at Ibrox against Rangers which the Dons lost 4–0. 16-year-old Ryan Duncan made his debut in the match. They failed to win at Hamilton Academical and were knocked out of the League Cup by St Mirren due to a late error by goalkeeper Joe Lewis.

December
Form did not improve at the start of December, again failing to beat St Mirren. Midfielder Lewis Ferguson was "harshly" sent off in the match. Defender Michael Devlin, who had just come back from injury, was ruled out for three months. Defender Andrew Considine signed a new contract keeping him at the club until summer of 2022. Former defender Chic McLelland died on Boxing Day aged 63. The Dons form improved and went unbeaten throughout the whole of the month but their final game of the year away to Livingston was postponed due to a frozen pitch. It was initially rescheduled for 13 January.

January
The year started with a frustrating goalless draw against Dundee United, with McInnes stating he 'expects more'. Youngster Calvin Ramsay signed a new contract until 2024. Bruce Anderson and Miko Virtanen were recalled from their respective loan spells. Greg Leigh extended his contract to stay at the club until the end of the season. Aberdeen were drawn in the third round of the Scottish Cup to play either Dumbarton or Huntly away from home. The Dons played Rangers at home and lost, finishing the match with ten men as Ryan Hedges was sent off and given a two match ban. Gary Woods extended his loan deal until the end of the season. Ryan Edmondson returned to Leeds United. The away match to Livingston was postponed again only minutes after it was supposed to kick off due to heavy rainfall. Goalkeeper Tomáš Černý left the club and announced his retirement from football. Aberdeen were then hammered away to Ross County losing 4–1. Jonny Hayes and Ash Taylor were both injured in the match but recovered, Ross McCrorie was also injured and ruled out for three weeks. The Dons seen off ten-man Motherwell winning 2–0. Miko Virtanen made his first team debut. Scott Wright rejected a new deal and initially signed a pre-contract for Premiership rivals Rangers. St Johnstone then held the Dons to a 'dull' goalless draw. Funso Ojo joined Wigan Athletic on loan until the end of the season. Attacker Connor McLennan signed on until Summer 2023. Ethan Ross was recalled from his loan with Raith Rovers. In the rearranged match with Livingston, it ended in another goalless draw. The following day, striker Sam Cosgrove signed for English Championship club Birmingham City for a rumoured fee of £2,000,000.

February
On deadline day, strikers Fraser Hornby from French Ligue 1 side Reims and Callum Hendry from fellow Premiership side St Johnstone both joined the club until the end of the season. Another striker Bruce Anderson was loaned out again but to fellow Premiership side Hamilton Academical. Fellow striker Curtis Main left the club and joined English Football League side Shrewsbury Town. Former Hibernian and Rangers striker Flo Kamberi signed on loan from Swiss Super League side St Gallen, subject to International clearance. Michael Ruth, Jack MacKenzie, Luke Turner & Conor Power were all recalled from their respective loan spells. And finally, Ross McCrorie made his £350,000 move permanent early after a fee reported to be £175,000 was accepted for the permanent transfer of Scott Wright to Rangers. Livingston won at Pittodrie for the first time since 2004, beating the Dons 2–0. Attacker Ryan Hedges was injured in the match and a few days later, ruled out until the end of the season. Aberdeen then lost 2–0 again this time away to fellow European chasers Hibernian. In the match, Greg Leigh pulled up with a hamstring injury and Connor McLennan was subbed on but then later subbed off. Chairman Dave Cormack met McInnes after the match and insisted they were 'fully behind' the manager. The goalless run continued with a home draw against St Mirren. Florian Kamberi made his debut in the match becoming the first Swiss and Albanian to play for the Dons. After the match, chairman Dave Cormack cancelled a planned Q&A with fans, citing his backing for the manager. Venezuelan defender Ronald Hernández joined affiliated club Atlanta United for the duration of the MLS Season. For the first time in their history, Aberdeen failed to score a goal in six matches after a narrow 1–0 defeat to Celtic. However, the goal drought was ended by Callum Hendry in a narrow 1–0 home win against Kilmarnock.

March
Derek McInnes left the club by mutual consent on 8 March after eight years in charge. First team coach Paul Sheerin took over as interim manager for the 1–0 defeat at Dundee United. On 23 March,  Stephen Glass took over as manager.

April
Glass' first official match in charge seen the Dons win against Livingston in an entertaining Scottish Cup match, having only taken training for three days. However, the Dons were beaten 3–0 by Dundee United in the following round who put in a "Fantastic performance" to see them knocked out in the Quarter final stages.

May
The Dons ended the season in Fourth place with the majority of the season played behind closed doors.

Results & fixtures

Pre-season

Scottish Premiership

Scottish League Cup 

Aberdeen received a bye into the Second Round as they had qualified for Europe from the previous season. They were drawn to play St Mirren. However, they were knocked out by the Paisley outfit due to a late error by goalkeeper Joe Lewis.

Scottish Cup 

Aberdeen entered the Third Round of the Scottish Cup and were drawn to play either Dumbarton or Huntly away from home. The Cup was temporarily suspended until March 2021. Dumbarton won the tie and the match was chosen for television coverage on the BBC.

UEFA Europa League

Qualifying rounds

Squad statistics 
Note: Statistics for the delayed 2019–20 Scottish Cup semi-final played on 1 November 2020 are recorded under the 2019–20 Aberdeen F.C. season article (they are recorded under the 2020–21 season by some resources).

Appearances 

|-
|colspan="17"|Players who left the club during the season
|-

|}

Goalscorers 
As of 15 May 2021

Disciplinary record 
As of 15 May 2021

Team statistics

League table

Results by round

Transfers

Players in

Players out

Loans in

Loans out

See also 
 List of Aberdeen F.C. seasons

Footnotes

References 

2020-21
Scottish football clubs 2020–21 season
2020–21 UEFA Europa League participants seasons